Steven James Cisowski (born January 23, 1963) is a former American football offensive tackle in the National Football League (NFL) for the Dallas Cowboys. He played college football at Santa Clara University.

Early years
Cisowski attended Westmont High School, in Campbell, California, where he participated in football, basketball, wrestling, and track.

He accepted a football scholarship from NCAA Division II Santa Clara University. He was named a starter at guard as a freshman. As a senior starter at left tackle, he helped his team gain a school-record 751 yards on offense against San Francisco State University. He finished his college career after making 32 straight starts.

Professional career

New York Giants
Cisowski was selected by the New York Giants in the 8th round (214th overall) of the 1986 NFL Draft. He was waived on August 4.

Dallas Cowboys
On December 20, 1986, he was signed as a free agent by the Dallas Cowboys. He was released on September 7, 1987.

After the NFLPA strike was declared on the third week of the 1987 season, those contests were canceled (reducing the 16 game season to 15) and the NFL decided that the games would be played with replacement players. He was re-signed to be a part of the Dallas replacement team that was given the mock name "Rhinestone Cowboys" by the media. He started 3 games at right tackle. He was released on October 26.

In 1988, he was signed to participate in training camp. He was released on August 29.

References

1963 births
Living people
People from Campbell, California
Players of American football from California
American football offensive tackles
Santa Clara Broncos football players
Sportspeople from Santa Clara County, California
Dallas Cowboys players
National Football League replacement players